Lucky Thirteen is a compilation album by Canadian / American musician Neil Young, released in 1993. It contains thirteen of Young's Geffen-era songs between 1982 and 1988, including four tracks that were previously unreleased, and three that are slightly different edits to their original versions.

It was the first Neil Young album (solo or otherwise) not to be distributed by Warner Music Group. Two years after Young's departure from Geffen, the label, originally distributed by Warner Bros. Records, was sold to MCA Music Entertainment. Young's Geffen-era recordings, now owned by Universal Music Group, represent the only works in his catalog that are not owned by Warner Music Group, with which he has had a long-standing relationship, dating to when his first band Buffalo Springfield was signed to Atco Records (which was actually not a sister label to WBR at the time of the signing, only becoming so in 1967).

Track listing
"Sample and Hold" (Previously unreleased version; original shorter version from Trans, 1982) – 8:04
"Transformer Man" (Short edit) (Trans) – 3:19
"Depression Blues" (Previously unreleased; from the original Old Ways, 1983) – 4:07
"Get Gone" (Previously unreleased; live with the Shocking Pinks – Hara Arena, Dayton - 18 September 1983) – 5:06
"Don't Take Your Love Away from Me" (Previously unreleased; live with the Shocking Pinks – Hara Arena, Dayton - 18 September 1983) – 6:16
"Once an Angel" (Old Ways, 1985) – 3:54
"Where is the Highway Tonight?" (Old Ways) – 3:04
"Hippie Dream" (Long edit) (Landing on Water, 1986) – 4:26
"Pressure" (Landing on Water) – 2:46
"Around the World" (Life, 1987) – 5:28
"Mideast Vacation" (Life) – 4:22
"Ain't It the Truth" (Previously unreleased; live with the Bluenotes – The Agora Ballroom, Cleveland - 23 April 1988) – 7:38
"This Note's for You" (Previously unreleased version; live with the Bluenotes - The Palace, Hollywood - 13 April 1988) – 5:34

Personnel

Neil Young – guitar, bass, synclavier, vocoder, electric piano, harmonica, vocals
Ralph Molina – drums, vocals
Frank Sampedro – guitar, keyboards
Karl Himmel – drums
Tim Drummond – bass
Ben Keith – pedal steel guitar, slide guitar, guitar, alto saxophone, vocals
Rufus Thibodeaux – fiddle
Spooner Oldham – organ
Anthony Crawford – maracas, vocals
Rick Palombi – tambourine, vocals
Craig Hayes – baritone saxophone
Waylon Jennings – guitar, vocals
Gordon Terry – fiddle
Joe Allen – bass
Hargus "Pig" Robbins – piano
Ralph Mooney – pedal steel guitar
David Kirby – guitar
Danny Kortchmar – guitar, synthesizer, vocals
Steve Jordan – drums, synthesizer, vocals
Billy Talbot – bass
Chad Cromwell – drums
Rick "The Bass Player" Rosas – bass
Steve Lawrence – tenor saxophone
Larry Cragg – baritone saxophone
Claude Cailliet – trombone
John Fumo – trumpet
Tom Bray – trumpet

References

Neil Young compilation albums
1993 greatest hits albums
Albums produced by David Briggs (producer)
Geffen Records compilation albums
Albums produced by Neil Young
Albums produced by Elliot Mazer
Albums produced by Ben Keith
Albums produced by Niko Bolas
Albums produced by Danny Kortchmar